Bangui Wind Farm is a wind farm in Bangui, Ilocos Norte, Philippines.

Phase I of the NorthWind power project in Bangui Bay consisted of 15 of those wind turbines, each with a maximum production capacity of 1.65 MW of electric power, making a total of 24.75 MW.

Phase II was completed in August 2008,  and added five more of the same wind turbines, bringing the total maximum capacity to 33 MW.

Ayala Corporation energy platform AC Energy, which already holds the controlling shares in Bangui Wind Farm as of 2021, has announced its intent to acquire 100% of the shares of NorthWind in order to boost their renewable energy portfolio, pending approvals from oversight entities like the Philippine Competition Commission.

Location
The NorthWind Bangui Bay Project is located in the municipality of Bangui, Ilocos Norte, Philippines, at the northwest tip of Luzon island. The turbines face the sea from where the prevailing wind blows towards the land. Its location along the shore is optimal, due to a lack of windbreaks and limited terrain roughness. The site consists of 20 Vestas Wind Systems stretching  over the shoreline of the bay.  The location of the Philippines near the Asia-Pacific monsoon belt is ideal for installing wind turbines.

State meteorological agency Philippine Atmospheric, Geophysical and Astronomical Services Administration states that the Philippines has a mean average of about 31 watts per square meter (W/m2) of wind power density.

History

1996 NREL study 
In 1996, the National Renewable Energy Laboratory (NREL) conducted a wind resource analysis and mapping study. It concluded that various areas in the Philippines are ideal for wind power installation. These areas include Bangui and Burgos towns in Ilocos Norte, Batanes and Babuyan Islands, which are north of Luzon and the higher interior terrain of Mindoro, Samar, Leyte, Panay, Negros, Cebu, Palawan and Eastern Mindanao.

Development by NorthWind 
The study led to the inception of the wind farm project. NorthWind Power Development Corp. developed (and maintains and operates) the project, while Vestas Wind Systems, a Danish firm, supplied the wind turbine-generator units (WTGs) for the site, similar to those already found in Denmark. The project was to have been developed in three phases, with Phase I of the project inaugurated on June 18, 2005.

Engineer Niels Jacobsen, president and chief executive of the Northwind Power Development Corp., started work on the 24.75-megawatt project in 1999.

Ratified by the NorthWind Power Development Corp and the International Bank for Reconstruction and Development through the World Bank Prototype Carbon Fund, the Northwind Bangui Bay Project was the first project in the Philippines to have the Emissions Reduction Purchase Agreement (ERPA) under the Clean Development Mechanism. The Bangui Bay Project is also the first Philippine recipient of the Carbon Emission Reduction Certificates (CER's) from the executive board of the United Nations Framework Convention on Climate Change.

Phase I consisted of 15 turbines, placed 326 meters apart, was completed on May 7, 2005, generating 24.74 megawatts. An additional 5 turbines brought the capacity to 33 megawatts, which was transmitted  to an electrical substation in Laoag City. Connected to the Luzon Grid, the windmills supply 40% of Ilocos Norte's electricity needs.

Commercial operation 
The project began commercial operation in 2005, eventually becoming a major tourist site for Bangui.

In 2006, the project produced a 5% discount of the weighted average price in the wholesale electricity spot market (WESM) or a generated savings of approximately US$1.4 million (PhP 70 million) for the INEC electricity consumers. The project cost for Phase I amounted to US$23 million.

Ownership by the Ayala Group 

AC Energy, the listed energy platform of the Ayala Group, eventually took control of Northwind  and of the Bangui Wind Farm in 2017, acquiring a total of 67.79% of Northwind stocks.

In 2021, AC Energy announced its intent to acquire 100% of the shares of NorthWind in order to boost the renewable energy portfolio of the Ayala Group in anticipation of its plans to achieve net zero greenhouse gas emissions by 2050. The purchase is pending approvals from Philippine government oversight entities like the Philippine Competition Commission.

See also

Sustainable energy
Wind Energy Power System (Philippines Wind Farm)

References

Buildings and structures in Ilocos Norte
Tourist attractions in Ilocos Norte
Wind farms in the Philippines